The 1921 Wabash Little Giants football team represented Wabash College during the 1921 college football season. The team's coach was Robert E. Vaughan.  In Robert E. Vaughan's 3rd year as head coach, the Little Giants compiled a 7–2 record and outscored their opponents by a total of 146 to 31.

Schedule

References

Wabash
Wabash Little Giants football seasons
Wabash Little Giants football